Rasik Dave (19 June 1957 – 29 July 2022) was an Indian actor working predominantly in Hindi television industry. He is best known for his role of Nanda baba, father of Krishna in B. R. Chopra's television show Mahabharat (1988). Dave was Bachelor of Laws but pursued acting as career. His first appearance was in the Gujarati film Putra Vadhu.

Family and death 
Dave was married to actress Ketki Joshi-Dave; who is daughter of actress Sarita Joshi and Gujarati theatre actor Pravin Joshi. They met in 1979 during a common play and married in 1983. They together have a daughter Riddhi Dave and son Abhishek Dave. Riddhi is also a theatre actress. Rasik Dave died on 29 July 2022 due to complications from kidney failure. He suffered since 4–5 years and was on dialysis frequently.

Filmography

References 

1957 births
2022 deaths
Male actors in Hindi television
Actors in Hindi cinema
Actors in Gujarati-language films
Deaths from kidney failure